Gilnockie railway station served the hamlet of Hollows, Dumfries and Galloway, Scotland from 1864 to 1967 on the Border Union Railway.

History 
The station opened in December 1864 by the Border Union Railway. The station was situated on the west side of an unnamed minor road. Despite the station opening in December 1864, it actually didn't appear in the Bradshaw timetable until October 1865. A loop to the west of the station served a cattle dock and to the east a siding passed a brick plinth for a crane. The station was always quiet except the Second World War when Canadian foresters were working in the forest dispatching large amounts of timber from the goods yard. The station was unstaffed from 2 February 1953, although 'halt' didn't appear on the end of its name. However, the goods yard was downgraded to a public delivery siding. After closure to passengers on 15 June 1964, the station remained open to goods traffic until 18 September 1967.

References

External links 

Disused railway stations in Dumfries and Galloway
Railway stations in Great Britain opened in 1864
Railway stations in Great Britain closed in 1964
Beeching closures in Scotland
Former North British Railway stations